Data recovery companies are companies that perform services to access data on physically damaged storage devices.

Data recovery companies
Data recovery